Norheim Church is a parish church of the Church of Norway in Karmøy Municipality in Rogaland county, Norway. It is located in the village of Norheim, just south of the town of Haugesund. It is the church for the Norheim parish which is part of the Karmøy prosti (deanery) in the Diocese of Stavanger. The plastered brick church was built in a rectangular design in 1978 using designs by the architect Bjarne Gjerde. The church seats about 425 people.

See also
List of churches in Rogaland
Informationen zur Orgel in Karmøy/Norheim

References

Karmøy
Churches in Rogaland
Brick churches in Norway
20th-century Church of Norway church buildings
Churches completed in 1978
1978 establishments in Norway